Clay Brown (born September 25, 1963) is a former NASCAR driver. He was a part-time fixture in the sport in the mid-1990s.

Craftsman Truck Series
Brown reappeared for a one-race deal in 2003, driving a second Xpress Motorsports truck at South Boston. Brown did well with the solid opportunity, qualifying 22nd. He would finish the race two laps down, but in the 17th position.

References

External links

Living people
NASCAR drivers
1963 births